Cnemaspis kotagamai, or Kotagama's day gecko, is a species of diurnal gecko endemic to island of Sri Lanka, described in 2019 from Ratnapura.

Etymology
The specific name kotagamai is named in honor of renowned and leading ornithologist Prof. Sarath Kotagama, for his contributions to the biodiversity conservation and management in Sri Lanka.

Taxonomy
The species is closely related to C. ingerorum and C. kallima morphological aspects.

Ecology
The species was discovered from a granite cave in Bambaragala forest, Pallebedda, Ratnapura.

Description
Snout-to-vent length is 29.8 mm in adult male. Granular scales are weakly keeled. Chin, gular, pectoral, and abdominal scales are smooth. There are 114–119 paravertebral granules. One precloacal pore is present. In males, 4–5 femoral pores are present. Median row of subcaudal scales are irregular, diamond-shaped, and small. Head is small with long snout. Small eyes have round pupils. Dorsum of head, body and limbs is generally brown. One broad, yellow vertebral stripe is running form occiput to tail. There are five irregular blackish-brown paravertebral blotches. A ‘W’-shaped dark marking is visible on occipital area. Tail is dorsally dark brown with 11 faded black cross-bands. There are two black postorbital stripes on each side. There is an oblique black line between the eye and nostril.

References

kotagamai
Reptiles of Sri Lanka
Endemic fauna of Sri Lanka
Taxa named by Aaron M. Bauer
Taxa named by Anslem de Silva
Taxa named by Mendis Wickramasinghe
Reptiles described in 2019